Philip Zialor (born September 6, 1976) is a Seychellois footballer. He was a striker on the Seychelles national football team.

Zialor holds national records for most goals in a career (with 14) and most in a single game, netting four against Mauritius in the 2008 COSAFA Cup. He also scored two of his team's four goals in the 2010 World Cup qualifying matches.

International goals 

Scores and results list Seychelles' goal tally first, score column indicates score after each Seychelles goal.

References

1976 births
Living people
Seychellois footballers
Seychelles international footballers

Association football forwards